Euriphene leonis, the Sierra Leone nymph, is a butterfly in the family Nymphalidae. It is found in Sierra Leone, Liberia, Ivory Coast and possibly western Ghana. The habitat consists of forests.

References

Butterflies described in 1899
Euriphene
Butterflies of Africa
Taxa named by Per Olof Christopher Aurivillius